Iberus is a genus of air-breathing land snails, terrestrial pulmonate gastropod mollusks in the subfamily Helicinae of the family Helicidae. 

This genus is endemic to the Iberian Peninsula.

Species and subspecies
According to the Fauna Europaea this genus contains the following species and subspecies:
 Iberus alonensis (A. Férussac, 1821)
 Iberus angustatus (Rossmässler, 1854)
 Iberus calaensis Ahuir, 2013
 Iberus campesinus (L. Pfeiffer, 1846)
 Iberus candoni Ahuir, 2021
 Iberus carthaginiensis (Rossmässler, 1853)
 † Iberus delgadoi (Roman, 1907) 
 Iberus gualtieranus (Linnaeus, 1758)
Iberus gualtieranus alonensis
Iberus gualtieranus campesinus
Iberus gualtieranus carthaginiensis
Iberus gualtieranus gualterianus
Iberus gualtieranus mariae
Iberus gualtieranus posthumus
Iberus gualtieranus rhodopeplus
 Iberus guiraoanus (L. Pfeiffer, 1853)
 Iberus marmoratus  (A. Férussac, 1821)
Iberus marmoratus alcarazanus
Iberus marmoratus cobosi
Iberus marmoratus guiraoanus
Iberus marmoratus loxanus
Iberus marmoratus marmoratus
Iberus marmoratus rositai
 Iberus ortizi García San Nicolás, 1957
 Iberus serpentinae Ahuir, 2020
Species inquirendum
 †  Iberus balatonicus Stoliczka, 1862 
Species brought into synonymy
 Iberus circejus Kobelt, 1903: synonym of Marmorana serpentina circeja (Kobelt, 1903) (objective synonym and secondary homonym )
 Iberus massyloe (Morelet, 1851): synonym of Massylaea massylaea (Morelet, 1851)
 Iberus melii Kobelt, 1903: synonym of Marmorana serpentina circeja (Kobelt, 1903) (objective junior synonym of Helix (Iberus) melii Kobelt, 1903)

References

 Bank, R. A. (2017). Classification of the Recent terrestrial Gastropoda of the World. Last update: July 16th, 2017

External links 
 Montfort P. [Denys de. (1808-1810). Conchyliologie systématique et classification méthodique des coquilles. Paris: Schoell. Vol. 1: pp. lxxxvii + 409 [1808]. Vol. 2: pp. 676 + 16 [1810 (before 28 May) ]

 
Helicidae
[[Category:Gastropod genera]